Vexillum approximatum is a species of small sea snail, marine gastropod mollusk in the family Costellariidae, the ribbed miters.

Description
The ovate shell is turreted. The whorls are convexly angulated at the sutures, longitudinally ribbed and crossed by impressed striae. The interstices are punctured. The aperture is striated within. The columella is four-plaited. The color of the shell is white, banded and blotched irregularly with chestnut-brown.

Distribution
This marine species occurs off the Philippines and Hawaii

References

 Turner H. 2001. Katalog der Familie Costellariidae Macdonald, 1860. Conchbooks. 1–100 page(s): 17

External links
 Pease, W. H. (1860). Descriptions of new species of Mollusca from the Sandwich Islands. Proceedings of the Zoological Society of London. 28: 18-36; 141-148.

approximatum
Gastropods described in 1860